Paulus Modestus Schücking (Paul Nicolaus Bernhard Joseph Schücking, genannt Modestus; 16 June 1787, Münster – 16 June 1867, Bremen) was a German lawyer, councillor, philosopher and writer. He was also the husband of Katharina Sibylla Schücking and the father of Levin Schücking.

1787 births
1867 deaths
German philosophers

German male writers
People from Münster
19th-century German lawyers